This was the tournament's first edition.

Cho Yoon-jeong and Jeon Mi-ra won the title, by defeating Chuang Chia-jung and Hsieh Su-wei 6–3, 1–6, 7–5 in the final. It was the 1st and only title for both players in their respective careers.

Seeds

Draw

Draw

References
 Draw on ITF website
 Draw on WTA website

Korea Open (tennis)
Hansol Korea Open